The 2001 Sultan Azlan Shah Cup was the 11th edition of field hockey tournament the Sultan Azlan Shah Cup.

Participating nations
Seven countries participated in the tournament:

Results

Preliminary round

Fixtures

Classification round

Fifth and sixth place

Third and fourth place

Final

Statistics

Final standings

Goalscorers

References

External links
Official website

2001 in field hockey
2001
2001 in Malaysian sport
2001 in Indian sport
2001 in English sport
2001 in South Korean sport
2001 in Australian sport
2001 in German sport
2001 in Pakistani sport